Irina Isayevna Nakhova  (born 1955 in Moscow) is a Russian artist. Her father, Isai Nakhov, is a philologist. At 14 years old her mother took her to Victor Pivovarov's Atelier. Pivovarov played an important role in her life and later became her mentor. In 2015, Nakhova became the first female artist to represent Russia in its pavilion at the Venice Biennial. She is represented by Nailya Alexander Gallery in New York City. Nakhova currently lives and works in Moscow and New Jersey.
She works with different mediums like fine art, photography, sounds, sensors and inflatable materials.
She is a Laureate of the Kandinsky 2013 Award.

Career

Nakhova graduated from the Graphic Design Department of the Moscow Polygraphic Institute in 1978. She was a member of the Union of Artists of the USSR from 1986 to 1989 and, alongside her friends and colleagues Ilya Kabakov, George Kisevalter, Vladimir Sorokin, Dmitrii Prigov, and Andrei Monastyrsky, is considered one of the founding members of Moscow Conceptualism. Nakhova received international recognition as a young artist for Rooms (1983–1987), the first "total installation" in Russian art, located in the Moscow apartment where she still lives today.

In 1988, Nakhova was one of the youngest artists included in Sotheby's first auction in Moscow. The "groundbreaking" auction, titled "Avant-Garde and Soviet Art", realized more than $3,000,000 USD and marked a major step forward in the opening of Russian art to Western European and American markets. Nakhova's work caught the attention of American gallerist Phyllis Kind, who gave the artist three solo shows in New York in the early 1990s, Nakhova's first exhibitions in the United States.

From 1994 to 1997 she was a professor in a university in Detroit in the US. In 2011, Nakhova was featured as a special guest of the Fourth Moscow Biennale of Contemporary Art at the Moscow Museum of Modern Art. As part of a large-scale retrospective of Nakhova's work, her seminal installation Room No. 2 (1983–1987) was a result of her frustration from the oppressive Soviet regime, located in her Moscow apartment where she lives today.

In 2013, Nakhova was awarded the Kandinsky Prize in the category of Project of the Year, one of the highest honors in contemporary Russian art, for her work Untitled. Nakhova described Untitled as "my reckoning with history as comprehended through the history of my family – my grandma, executed grandpa, mom, dad and my past self. This is my attempt to understand the inexplicable state of affairs that has reigned in my country for the last century, and to understand through private imagery how millions of people were erased from history and happily forgotten; how people have been blinded and their souls destroyed so that they can live without memory and history."

2015 Venice Biennale

In 2015, Nakhova was chosen to represent Russia in its pavilion at the Venice Biennale. She was the first female artist to represent Russia in a solo pavilion. "Based on a dialogue with the pavilion structure itself, designed by Aleksei Shchusev in 1914, The Green Pavilion relates to installation art as much as it does to architecture," writes Stella Kesaeva, President of Stella Art Foundation, in the catalogue for the installation. "As with [Vadim] Zakharov's project, the architectural features of the pavilion comprise an important component of Nakhova's installation. This time, an opening has again been created between the first and second floors of Schusev's building, plus the exterior is painted green. The result: the Russian Pavilion takes on the appearance of a romantic gazebo, while concealing within itself the spatial metaphor of Kazimir Malevich's Black Square (1915). Another installation presented in this pavilion was her project 'rooms' which were a complex of five different spaces between art, architecture and the viewers point of view."

Selected exhibitions

Nakhova’s work has been shown in over thirty solo exhibitions and numerous major group exhibitions worldwide. Major exhibitions include Post Pop: East Meets West (Saatchi Gallery, London, 2014); Irina Nakhova and Pavel Pepperstein: Moscow Partisan Conceptualism (Orel Art UK, London, 2010); Moscow Installation (Künstlerhaus, Kalrsruhe, Germany, 2006); Berlin–Moscow / Moscow–Berlin, 1950–2000 (Martin-Gropius-Bau, Berlin, and State Tretyakov Gallery, Moscow, 2003–04); Global Conceptualism: Points of Origin, 1950s–1980s (Queens Museum, New York, 1999); Laughter Ten Years After (which travelled to six museums and galleries in the United States and Canada, 1995); After Perestroika: Kitchenmaids or Stateswomen (Centre international d’art contemporain de Montréal, 1993); The Work of Art in the Age of Perestroika (Phyllis Kind Gallery, New York, 1990); and Iskunstvo: Moscow– Berlin (Bahnhof Westend, West Berlin, 1988). Nakhova's work has also be shown in over ten group exhibitions. These include, Thinking Pictures: Moscow Conceptual Art in the Dodge Collection. Zimmerli Art Museum, Rutgers University,( New Brunswick, NJ 2016), Post Pop: East Meets West, Saatchi Gallery (London, 2015), Adresse provisoire pour I’art contemporain russe. Musée de la (2013).  Her work can be found in private collections and museum collections such as Tate Modern, London; The Norton and Nancy Dodge Collection of Soviet Nonconformist Art, New Brunswick; The State Tretyakov Gallery, Moscow; and the Moscow Museum of Modern Art. She has taught contemporary art at Wayne State University, Carnegie Mellon University, Princeton University, and the International Summer Academy of Fine Arts, Salzburg, among other institutions.

Collections

Nakhova's work is in public and private collections throughout France, Germany, Great Britain, Italy, Spain, Sweden, Switzerland, and the United States. In Russia, her work can be found at the Moscow Museum of Modern Art, the National Centre for Contemporary Arts, and The State Tretyakov Gallery, Moscow.

Nakhova's work is part of the Norton and Nancy Dodge Collection of Soviet Nonconformist Art, one of the largest collections of Soviet-era art outside Russia, amassed by American economist Norton Dodge from the late 1950s until the advent of Perestroika in the 1980s. Dodge smuggled nearly 10,000 works of art from the USSR to the United States during the height of the Cold War, often at great personal risk, a story detailed at length in John McPhee's The Ransom of Russian Art (1994). The collection was donated to Rutgers University in the mid-1990s, where it is on permanent display at the University's Jane Voorhees Zimmerli Art Museum.

Publications

 Irina Nakhova: The Green Pavilion. Stella Art Foundation, 2015. Published on the occasion of the Venice Biennale 56th International Art Exhibition. 
 Irina Nakhova: Rooms. Moscow: Moscow Museum of Modern Art, 2011. Published on the occasion of Nakhova's Rooms retrospective exhibition at the Moscow Museum of Modern Art. 
 Irina Nakhova: Works 1973-2004. Salzburg, Moscow: International Summer Academy of Fine Arts, Salzburg; National Centre for Contemporary Arts, Moscow, 2004. Published on the occasion of the exhibition of the same name at Galerie im Traklhaus, Salzburg.

References

External links
 Irina Nakhova at Nailya Alexander Gallery
 Irina Nakhova at Saatchi Gallery
 The Russian Pavilion
 Irina Nakhova: The Green Pavilion
 Irina Nakhova: Moscow Conceptualism
 Interview with the artist Irina Nakhova of the Russian Pavilion at the Venice Biennale 2015
 Irina Nakhova: 'Real freedom in your apartment’, video interview by Tate

1955 births
Living people
20th-century Russian painters
Artists from Moscow
Russian installation artists
Ramapo College faculty
Russian women painters
Women installation artists
20th-century Russian women artists
Russian contemporary artists
21st-century Russian women artists
Kandinsky Prize